The Swarm may refer to:

Music
 "The Swarm" (song), a 2012 song by British rock band You Me At Six
 "The Swarm", song by At the Gates from the album Terminal Spirit Disease, 1994
 The Swarm, Dominic Glynn's band name for a music project
 The Swarm (album), 1998 album by various artists affiliated with or part of the Wu-Tang Clan
 All About Eve (band), formerly known as The Swarm, British rock band

Film and television
 The Swarm (1978 film), a film based on a novel with bees as a menace
 The Swarm (1990 film), a Soviet drama film
 The Swarm (2020 film), a French fantasy drama film
 "The Swarm" (Star Trek: Voyager), an episode of Star Trek: Voyager
 The Swarm (TV series), a 2023 European Alliance co-produced TV series

Literature
 The Swarm (Schätzing novel), a 2004 science fiction novel by Frank Schätzing
 The Swarm (Card and Johnston novel), a 2016 science fiction novel by Orson Scott Card and Aaron Johnston
 Galaxy of Fear: The Swarm, a book in the Galaxy of Fear series by John Whitman set in the Star Wars galaxy

Other uses
 The Swarm (roller coaster), a B&M Wing Coaster at Thorpe Park in the United Kingdom
 Zerg, also known as The Swarm, race in the Starcraft video game series

See also
 Swarm (disambiguation)